Nafisi is an Iranian surname. Notable people with the surname include:

 Abdullah Al-Nafisi (born 1945), Kuwaiti academic and politician
 Ahmad Nafisi (1919–2004), Iranian bureaucrat and mayor of Tehran (1961–1963)
 Azar Nafisi (born 1948), Iranian-American writer and academic
 Habib Nafisi (1908–1984), Iranian academic
 Khalid Al-Nafisi (1937–2006), Kuwaiti actor
 Nezhat Nafisi (1920–2003), Iranian politician
 Saeed Nafisi (1895–1966), Iranian scholar, fiction writer and poet

Iranian-language surnames